In Hawaiian mythology, kaiwa is a trickster god who killed goddess Haumea at Niuhelewai, by catching her in a net obtained from Makali’i.   He then killed Lonokaeho, also called Piokeanuenue, king of Ko'olau, by singing an incantation.  Kaowa is known for being extremely powerful and strong, both physically and with magic, and he had many adventures in Hawaiian mythology.

Family 
His parents were Kukaohialaka and Hinauluohia and he was born on Oahu island. Kaulu was the youngest of three siblings, his older brother's were named Kaeha and Kamano.  When Kaulu was still a baby in his mother's womb, his older brother Kamano threatened to kill him, but then Kaulu's other brother, Kaeha, said he would protect Kaulu.  Because of the danger of Kamano, Kaulu waited for five years in his mother's womb, and he shape-shifted into a piece of rope to be born. Kaulu was then born as a piece of rope, and so, Kamano did not kill him, and Kaeha put the rope on a shelf and protected it until Kaulu turned back into humanoid form. Although it is unclear just what exactly Kaulu's parents were, as they might have been either humans or gods or perhaps a sort of humanoid race of earthly gods, Kaulu himself is definitely a deity and is often thought of as a trickster god. Kaulu grew up and was very strong and powerful, and he protected Kaeha and saved him from many attacks by other gods and monsters. Kaulu's wife was called Kekele and she never bore any children.

Abilities 
The Hawaiian god Kaulu has many strange abilities and is an extremely powerful fighter.  Kaulu is a trickster god and is quite destructive and at times violent, and is known for being one of the most powerful beings in their mythology. In fact, Kaulu was even powerful enough to kill several other deities of the Hawaiian pantheon. Kaulu is immortal and does not age.  Kaulu also seems to be invulnerable to being harmed when fighting.  In one the legends of Kaulu, he fought against some of the other gods and killed them, and he killed a huge monster shark.  Kaulu had his strange abilities since birth, he was already able to shape-shift, speak, and other things. Kaulu's brother Kaeha also displayed his shape-shifting ability when he turned into a tiny size and hid in a leaf while speaking to people as a prank, and making them sacrifice their alcoholic beverage to him. Kaulu also has the ability to communicate with spirits, and when he was a kid he used the spirits to find his brother Kaeha.  It would seem that Kaulu actually has some kind of reality warping ability as well.  When Kaulu was just a child he challenged the ocean and its waves to a fight, and the huge, many story high waves crashed against him, but they he didn't even budge.  Kaulu then struck the ocean, and ever since then, the waves around Hawaii have been much smaller.  In another legend, Kaulu's brother Kaeha was tricked by some of the gods to go out on a surfboard then be eaten by the chief of sharks, so Kaulu then drained the entire ocean by drinking it, hence why the ocean is salty.  Kaulu then tore the jaws of the shark apart with his bare hands and freed and saved his brother Kaeha.  The story mentions Kaulu being attacked by some other supernatural figure with a lightning bolt, and Kaulu blocked the lightning bolt with one finger. In the legends of Kaulu, he was even able to pull pranks on the spirits and gods and was so good at shape-shifting that not even spirits could find him when he hid from them. The Hawaiian seer or sage Makali stated that Kaulu is "all-powerful". In another part of the legend, Kaulu flies or travels to the realm of the gods in heaven and asks them for food.  The guards jokingly agree to let him have as much as he can carry, and Kaulu takes all of the food and storage of their entire farm in his arms.

Stories of Kaulu
In one of  Kaulu's first stories as a kid, he challenged the ocean and its waves to a fight.  Kaulu mocked the spirits of, or spirits which control the waves and swells, and taunted them.  Kaulu asked them how strong they were and when they said they were very strong, Kaulu fought them.   When Kaulu struck the surf and waves, it caused them to become weak and that is why the waves are smaller today.  In another feat of reality bending, Kaulu then faced off against a huge dog monster and tore it to bloody pieces, which is why dogs are smaller now as well, says the story. Kaulu then found his older brother Kaeha, and he lived in a village where there were also a certain group called The Akua, possibly spirits.  They all liked to drink an alcoholic beverage called Awa. Kaulu and his brother Kaeha performed pranks on the Akua, before they went to all drink Awa, Kaulu told his brother Kaeha  "Yes, tell the akua to drink their 'awa first, and you will take yours after them. But before you drink yours, offer a little to me as your god by saying: 'Here is our awa." Kaeha then did so, and after sacrificing to Kaulu, Kaulu answered from the darkness, hiding in a leaf. The Akua then thought Kaeha had a powerful god he was sacrificing to, and it even puzzled Kane and Kanaloa, who then sent Kolea to ask the sage Makali about it.  Makali said "Kaulu, the youngest brother of Kaeha is all-powerful and strong, and he's hiding in the palm leaves." The Akua then searched for Kaulu in the palm leaves but could not find him. One story says he put stones in the resting places of "The akua" so they would hit their heads on them when they woke up, and then tried to attack Kaeha and Kaulu, and refused to share food with them.  Kaulu is often described as a small and young looking boy in these stories.

Multiple Hawaiian legends tell of a great famine that once struck Hawaii.  Some versions of the story cite Haumea as the cause, and show Kaulu as the hero who saves the people by tricking the gods and sages in heaven into letting him take all their food.  Kaulu then obtains a magical net from the divine sage Makali'i and uses it to trap and murder Haumea.
 
Another part of the Kaulu story says he killed the "shark of the gods", which was a huge chief shark that some of the Hawaiian gods used to send out to kill things with.
Kaulu killed  Kukama-ulu-nui-akea, who apparently he then threw up into the milky way, out into the galaxy.

"The king shark of Kane and Kanaloa in Lewa-lani, called Ku-kama-ulu-nui-akea or Kalake‘e-nui-a-Kane, whom Kaulu slays in this legend and whose spirit flies up to the Milky Way, has its prototype in the South Seas. In the Tuamotus the Milky Way is the sacred ocean of Kiho-tumu; the dark rift in the Milky Way is his sacred ship, called The-long-shark."

Sources 

Hawaiian mythology
Trickster gods